Patrick Gallacher (21 August 1909 – 4 January 1992) was a Scottish footballer who played for Stoke City, Sunderland and the Scotland national football team as a striker.

Club career
Gallacher was born in Bridge of Weir and started his footballing career Linwood St Conval and Bridge of Weir before moving to Sunderland. He made his debut on 21 September 1929 against Arsenal in a 1–0 loss at Roker Park. He was part of the 1937 FA Cup Final winning side against Preston North End. In his career at Sunderland, Gallacher made 309 appearances and scored 108 goals in all competitions. He helped the Black Cats to win the First Division in 1935–36, scoring 20 goals in that title winning season. He then moved on to Stoke City in December 1938. He only managed to play four matches for Stoke due to injury and left at the end of the 1938–39 just before the outbreak of World War II. He then made wartime appearances for Dundee United and Morton in Scotland and also played in Ireland for Coleraine and Cork United before signing for Cheltenham Town in September 1948, playing eight games before leaving.

International career
Gallacher won his first cap for Scotland on 20 October 1934 against Ireland in a 2–1 defeat at Windsor Park in which he scored Scotland's only goal. This turned out to be his only ever cap for his country.

Career statistics

Club
Source:

International
Source:

Honours
Sunderland
 Football League First Division: 1935–36
 FA Charity Shield: 1936 
 FA Cup: 1936–37

References

External links
 

1909 births
1992 deaths
Footballers from Renfrewshire
Scottish footballers
Scotland international footballers
Sunderland A.F.C. players
Stoke City F.C. players
Cheltenham Town F.C. players
English Football League players
Association football forwards
Place of death missing
Dundee United F.C. wartime guest players
Greenock Morton F.C. wartime guest players
FA Cup Final players